Baiersdorf is a town in the district of Erlangen-Höchstadt, in northern Bavaria, Germany.

Geography

Location
The major part of Baiersdorf is idyllically situated on a terrace which preserves the town from being flooded by the close Regnitz river. It is located exactly between Erlangen (eight kilometers in the south) and Forchheim (eight kilometers in the north).

Neighbor cities are Forchheim, Poxdorf, Langensendelbach, Bubenreuth, Möhrendorf and Hausen.

Division of the town
Baiersdorf consists of 4 districts
 Baiersdorf
 Hagenau
 Igelsdorf
 Wellerstadt

History
Baiersdorf was first mentioned in 1062 AD and has been chartered since 1460.

As Baiersdorf is famous for farming and processing horseradish, the Meerrettich Museum for horseradish ("the spiciest museum of the world") is located in the old center of the town. A horseradish queen is even chosen every year on the third Saturday in September. The margrave Johann der Alchimist (1401–1464) started the cultivation of horseradish in the region.

Baiersdorf's Jewish cemetery attests to the fact that the town has been home to Jews since the 15th century. Among others the family of Joseph Seligman who emigrated to the United States and founded an international bank lived there.

Joseph's brother James who later followed him to the United States, is the grandfather of American art collector and socialite Peggy Guggenheim.

The district of Hagenau was founded in 1939 as a German Luftwaffe base. French prisoners of war lived there. After 1945, Hagenau was a home for refugees from the Sudetenland. Today it is a part of the town, and the Karl Höfner Corporation is located there, world famous for its guitars and bass guitars.

In July 2007, the town was flooded by torrential rain. Over 1000 homes were flooded, and the Bundesautobahn was temporarily closed to traffic.

Government
The City Council consists of 21 members, including the mayor.
 CSU 9 + 1 Seats
 SPD 4 Seats
 FW 4 Seats
 Ökologische Wählergemeinschaft 3 Seats

Culture and sights

Museums
 Horseradish-Museum

Monuments
 A Jewish cemetery reminds of the Jewish residents of the town which were persecuted in Nazi Germany and killed during the Holocaust
 Monument for the Castle Scharfeneck
 The old Town Hall with a pillory in which the Greek restaurant "Irodion" is located today.

Notable people 

 Joseph Aub (1804-1880), rabbi in Bayreuth, Mainz and Berlin; born in Baiersdorf
 Joseph Seligman (1819-1880), American banker, born in Baiersdorf
 Stefan Schwarzmann (born 1965 in Erlangen), German musician who grew up in Baiersdorf, drummer from bands like Running Wild, U.D.O., Accept or Helloween
 Hisham Zreiq (born 1968), Palestinian visual artist and filmmaker.

References

External links
  
 Judenfriedhof Baiersdorf
 Foracheim: St. Nikolaus in Baiersdorf
 Schweres Unwetter im Juli 2007 richtet in Baiersdorf erheblichen Schaden an
 Karl Höfner GmbH
 Schamel Horseradish

Erlangen-Höchstadt
Holocaust locations in Germany